Marcel Langer (born 16 February 1997) is a German professional footballer, who plays as a midfielder who plays for Hannoverscher SC.

He came through the Hannover and Schalke youth systems before signing for Heart of Midlothian in January 2020.

Career statistics

References

External links
 
 

1997 births
Living people
People from Stadthagen
German footballers
Association football midfielders
Regionalliga players
Scottish Professional Football League players
Hannover 96 II players
FC Schalke 04 II players
Heart of Midlothian F.C. players
VfB Germania Halberstadt players
Hannoverscher SC players
German expatriate footballers
German expatriate sportspeople in Scotland
Expatriate footballers in Scotland
Footballers from Lower Saxony